Sugar Is Not Sweet ( or Namtarn mai warn) is a 1965 Thai romantic comedy film written and directed by Rattana Pestonji. It was the director's final feature film. The film was featured in a retrospective program to the director at the 2005 Pusan International Film Festival.

Plot
Chaokun Charoenkesa, the owner of a shop that sells hair-loss treatments, wants to pay back his debt of kindness to a friend, whose formula is responsible for the Chaokun's prosperity. So he arranges for his good-for-nothing son, Manas, to marry Sugar, the daughter of his dear friend.

Cameo
Rattana Pestonji has a cameo appearance in this film as the doctor who treats Chaokun in his moment of death.

External links 
 Sugar Is Not Sweet at the Pusan International Film Festival
 Sugar Is Not Sweet at SiamZone 

1965 films
Thai-language films
1965 romantic comedy films
Films directed by Rattana Pestonji
Thai romantic comedy films